Martin Dodd is a Danish-born music executive.

Dodd is  a former Sony Music International senior VP of worldwide A&R.

Early life

Career
Dodd began as a 17-year-old in the Danish label Mega Records. Here he worked himself up until his first in 1990 signed a contract with Ace of Base, which sold over 30 million records. Dodd has also done television concepts, some with John de Mol.

References

External links
http://www.billboard.com/biz/articles/news/1445219/sony-confirms-martin-dodd-in-global-ar-role
http://musicheadline.blogspot.com/2012/04/international-superstars-have-discreet_15.html
http://politiken.dk/kultur/art5022385/Superstjerner-har-diskret-dansk-bagmand
http://www.hitsheet.co.uk/messageboard/messages/1/2777.html?1076501372
http://www.allmusic.com/artist/martin-dodd-mn0001681600
https://www.discogs.com/artist/1865943-Martin-Dodd
http://www.independent.co.uk/arts-entertainment/music/features/the-music-industrys-100-most-influential-people-5355761.html

Living people
Year of birth missing (living people)
Place of birth missing (living people)
Businesspeople from London